The 2008 Pendle Borough Council election took place on 1 May 2008 to elect members of Pendle Borough Council in Lancashire, England. One third of the council was up for election and the Liberal Democrats lost overall control of the council to no overall control.

After the election, the composition of the council was
Liberal Democrat 20
Conservative 16
Labour 10
British National Party 2
Independent 1

Background
Before the election the Liberal Democrats held control of the council with 28 seats, but a loss of 4 seats would mean they lost their majority. 17 seats were contested in the election, with the Liberal Democrats defending 12, the Conservatives 4 and Labour 1 seat.

5 councillors stood down at the election, 2 Liberal Democrats from Bradley and Walverden wards, 2 Conservatives from Earby and Reedley and Labour's David Whalley from Vivary Bridge ward. Councillors who were defending seats included the leader of the council, Liberal Democrat Alan Davies, in Boulsworth, deputy mayor Marjorie Adams in Coates ward and the chairman of the Nelson committee David Foster in Clover Hill. The only candidates standing in the election not from the 3 main parties, were 4 from the British National Party and 2 independents.

Campaign
The election saw complaints of voting fraud involving postal voting, leading to a police investigation and the matter being raised in Parliament by the local Member of Parliament Gordon Prentice. These allegations involved both the Liberal Democrat parliament candidate for Pendle constituency Afzal Anwar and Labour councillor Mohammed Tariq, after multiple postal votes were registered at their addresses. Both men denied doing anything and were supported by their parties, saying everyone registered at the addresses were entitled to vote. The police dropped the enquiry after concluding that there had been no wrongdoing.

During the campaign the national Liberal Democrat leader Nick Clegg visited Pendle to support his party.

Election result
The results saw the Liberal Democrats lost their majority on the council after suffering a net loss of 8 seats. Defeated councillors for the Liberal Democrats included the leader of the council Alan Davies in Boulsworth, Nelson Committee chairman David Foster in Clover Hill, Shelley Franklin in Craven, Frank Wren in Brierfield and Judith Robinson in Southfield. The Liberal Democrats blamed their defeats on a targeted campaign by the Conservatives, while the Conservatives said the "tide is now turning towards us".

The Labour and Conservative parties both made significant gains from the Liberal Democrats. However Labour did lose one seat back to the Liberal Democrats in Vivary Bridge and the Conservatives lost a seat in Marsden to the British National Party. There was also a success for an independent candidate, with Glenn Whittaker taking Craven from the Liberal Democrats. These results meant the Liberal Democrats held 20 seats, the Conservatives 16, Labour 10, British National Party 2 as well as 1 independent. Overall turnout in the election was 41.58%.

Following the election the parties held talks on control of the council with reports that an agreement between the Conservative and Labour parties to take over from the Liberal Democrats was possible. However these were not successful and the new leader of the Liberal Democrats group, John David, became leader of the council at the head of a minority administration, after an 18-17 vote at the council meeting.

Ward results

References

2008 English local elections
2008
2000s in Lancashire